Glentworth can refer to:
Glentworth, Lincolnshire, a village in England;
Glentworth, Saskatchewan, an unincorporated community in Canada;
, a cargo steamer launched in 1920.
Glentworth, Paddington, a house in Paddington, Queensland